Larisa Neiland and Natasha Zvereva were the defending champions, but decided not to play together.

Zvereva and Gigi Fernández defeated Neiland and Jana Novotná in the final, 6–4, 6–1 to win the ladies' doubles tennis title at the 1992 Wimbledon Championships.

Seeds

  Jana Novotná /  Larisa Neiland (final)
  Gigi Fernández /  Natasha Zvereva (champions)
  Arantxa Sánchez Vicario /  Helena Suková (semifinals)
  Martina Navratilova /  Pam Shriver (semifinals)
  Mary Joe Fernández /  Zina Garrison (fourth round)
  Katrina Adams /  Manon Bollegraf (third round)
  Lori McNeil /  Rennae Stubbs (fourth round)
  Jill Hetherington /  Kathy Rinaldi (first round)
  Patty Fendick /  Andrea Strnadová (third round)
  Sandy Collins /  Elna Reinach (third round)
  Nicole Provis /  Elizabeth Smylie (first round)
  Rachel McQuillan /  Claudia Porwik (first round)
  Isabelle Demongeot /  Nathalie Tauziat (third round)
  Anke Huber /  Claudia Kohde-Kilsch (third round)
  Katerina Maleeva /  Barbara Rittner (third round)
  Gretchen Magers /  Robin White (fourth round)

Qualifying

Draw

Finals

Top half

Section 1

Section 2

Bottom half

Section 3

Section 4

References

External links

1992 Wimbledon Championships on WTAtennis.com
1992 Wimbledon Championships – Women's draws and results at the International Tennis Federation

Women's Doubles
Wimbledon Championship by year – Women's doubles
Wimbledon Championships